Muhammad Sana Ullah Khan Masti Khel (born 21 October 1971) is a Pakistani politician, who had been a member of the National Assembly of Pakistan from August 2018 till January 2023 and a former member of Provincial Assembly of the Punjab.

Political career
In 2002 elections, he ran on Pakistan Muslim League (Q) ticket from NA-73, a national assembly constituency and was elected as member of National Assembly. In 2008 elections, he ran on Pakistan Muslim League (N) ticket from PP-47, a Punjab provincial constituency and won that election by securing 37,713 votes while his closest rival, an independent Amir Muhammad Khan secured 35,277 votes. He was also a candidate on National Assembly Constituency NA-73 in 2008 which he narrowly lost to an independent Abdul Majeed Khan Khanan Khel who would join PML (N) in 2013. He secured 82,740 votes compared to 83,850 votes of Khanan Khel.

He discontinued being a member of PML (N) and contested 2013 general election as an independent from NA-73. He secured 91,066 votes in that election but lost it to PML (N)'s Khanan Khel who secured 97,676 votes. In the same election, he also contested on PP-47 constituency.

References

Living people
Pakistan Tehreek-e-Insaf MNAs
Pakistan Tehreek-e-Insaf politicians
Pakistan Muslim League (N) MNAs
Pakistan Muslim League (Q) politicians
Pashtun people
Punjab University Law College alumni
1971 births
Punjab MPAs 2008–2013
Pakistani MNAs 2018–2023